Lynskey is an Irish surname. Notable people with this surname include:

Aoife Lynskey (born 1980), Irish camogie player
Brendan Lynskey (born 1956), Irish former athlete
Ed Lynskey, American poet, critic, and novelist
George Lynskey (1888 – 1957), English judge
Jeffrey Lynskey (born 1977), Irish hurling manager
Melanie Lynskey (born 1977), New Zealand actress
Michael Lynskey, New Zealand academic